Donald Alexander Macleod (1 November 1917 – 1999) was a Scottish footballer who played as a wing half for Motherwell. After he retired as a player, Macleod became the assistant trainer at Heart of Midlothian.

References

1917 births
1999 deaths
Date of death missing
Footballers from Edinburgh
Scottish footballers
Whitburn Junior F.C. players
Motherwell F.C. players
Association football coaches
Heart of Midlothian F.C. non-playing staff
Scottish Football League players
Scottish Junior Football Association players
Association football wing halves